James Bulling (born 12 February 1909) was an English professional footballer who played as a wing-half. He made appearances in the English Football League for Leicester City and Wrexham.

References

1909 births
Date of death unknown
English footballers
Association football midfielders
English Football League players
Nottingham Forest F.C. players
Shirebrook Miners Welfare F.C. players
Leicester City F.C. players
Wrexham A.F.C. players
Shrewsbury Town F.C. players